The International Revolutionary Marxist Tendency was an international Marxist group based in France led by Michel Pablo, also known as Michael Raptis, the former secretary of the Trotskyist Fourth International. It resulted from a split in the Fourth International over their favouring of the tactic of entrism sui generis, a clandestine form of "deep entryism" which involved eschewing overt organisation building efforts in favour of long term infiltration of social democratic and communist parties and high levels of secrecy over affiliations to Trotskyite groups or ideologies.

By 1963, a group of parties based around the large and open US Trotskyist Socialist Workers Party (SWP) were moving back towards unity with the Fourth International, due to the disappearance of the Pabloite Socialist Union of America and sharing close positions on the 1956 Hungarian uprising and the Cuban revolution. However the SWP were hostile towards Raptis and his tactic of deep entryism and regarded him as a barrier to that unification. A world congress in 1963 formed the reunified Fourth International. Although Raptis was elected to the international executive committee, tensions grew and Raptis and his supporters were outside the International by the end of 1965 although its disputed as to whether this was because they were expelled or had split voluntarily.

It was a small group largely based around the personality of Raptis, and based on the idea of Workers' self-management. In their first conference in 1972, they eschewed the Trotskyite label while still claiming to be Marxist although the national sections rejoined the Fourth International in the early 1990s, although Raptis himself did not rejoin.

As well as number of English-language publications in the 1960s and 1970, the British section, Socialist Alternatives, was behind the magazine Socialist Alternatives edited by Keir Starmer from 1986 to 1989

References

Trotskyist political internationals
Fourth International (post-reunification)